XCom Global  was a telecommunications company for international travelers, using pocket-sized MiFi service to provide unlimited data access.

History 
May 3, 2010-Established and started two data plan; limited for over 130 countries and unlimited data plan for 21 countries.
September 15, 2010-Expand unlimited plan for 32 countries.
April 2, 2011-Offered free Internet access for workers heading to Japan to aid in disaster recovery. 
August 1, 2011-Introduced a Euro SIM card, expanding unlimited plan for over 60 countries.
October 28, 2011-Selected as Finalist of TechAmerica High Tech Award.
November 14, 2011-XCom Global International MiFi Hotspot is awarded as The Best Products of 2011
January 3, 2012-Expand unlimited plan to a total of 195 countries.
March 7, 2012-Interview at the 2012 MWC in Barcelona
November 10, 2017-Announced "the closure of its USA operations."

Products 
XCom Global had two products; MiFi and USB. MiFi could be shared among several internet device(smartphone, laptop, etc.) at the same time. XCom covered multiple country trips with multiple devices.

References

External links 
 Official Page
 Gear Diary
 Gadgetwise in New York Times

Companies based in San Diego
Mobile virtual network operators
Telecommunications companies established in 1995
Telecommunications companies established in 2010